Mikhail Ivanovich Mozer (22 June 1935 – 28 October 1993) was a tennis player from Ukraine who competed for the Soviet Union.

Career
Mozer won the Soviet Championships in both 1959 and 1960. He was unbeaten in Davis Cup competition, winning all four of his singles rubbers, which were all played in 1963 ties, against Finland and Chile. The Ukrainian twice competed at Wimbledon. In the 1960 tournament he lost a five set opening round match to Jiří Javorský and at the same event three years later he again exited in the first round, losing to Rafael Osuna. His only other appearance in a Grand Slam tournament was at the 1960 French Championships, where he was unable to get past Ingo Buding in the opening round.

His daughter Russian pair skating coach Nina Mozer.

References

External links
   Mikhail Mozer at the sport-strana.ru
   Mikhail Mozer at the tennis-russia.su

1935 births
1993 deaths
Ukrainian male tennis players
Soviet male tennis players
People from Mukachevo
Sportspeople from Zakarpattia Oblast